, or the Most Holy Trinity of Paraná, is the name of a former Jesuit reduction in Paraguay.  It is an example of one of the many Jesuit reductions, small colonies established by the missionaries in various locations in South America, such as Brazil, Argentina and Paraguay throughout the 17th and 18th century. These missions were built as self-contained societies that existed outside of regular Spanish colonial life that integrated indigenous populations with Christian faith.

, often referred to by the locals as simply the "ruins of Trinidad" was one of the last of the Jesuit  to be built in the Paraná River area encompassing southern Paraguay and northern Argentina. It is also the most highly accessible and the most visited of the historical sites today.  Located near the modern day city of Encarnación, Trinidad was originally constructed in 1706, the intended self-sufficient city came complete with a central meeting plaza, where most of the celebrations, such as Mass and matrimony were celebrated, a large church meetinghouse, a school, several workshops, a museum and housing for the local Indian population.

Owing in part to its relatively recent construction, Trinidad bore the weathering of time fairly well, and modern historical societies have maintained the current, well-preserved state of the ruins to this day. It has also been named one of two UNESCO World Heritage Sites in Paraguay.

See also
 Guarani people
 History of Paraguay
 Jesuit Missions of La Santísima Trinidad de Paraná and Jesús de Tavarangue
 List of Jesuit sites
 Ruins of Jesús de Tavarangue
 Spanish missions in South America

References

External links
 

1706 establishments in the Spanish Empire
Churches completed in 1706
Jesuit history in South America
Roman Catholic churches in Paraguay
Ruins in Paraguay
Spanish missions in Paraguay
World Heritage Sites in Paraguay